Cloone River is a river in County Leitrim in Ireland. Its course is almost entirely within the boundaries of the Civil parish of Cloone. The river runs from the tripoint of the townlands Aghalough, Sunnaghconner, and Corraneary in an overall southsouthwesterly direction before it passes through Lough Errew and from there into Lough Rinn.

References

Rivers of County Leitrim